Abdul Momin (1788 – 29 May 1885) was the 24th Sultan of Brunei from 1852 until his death in 1885.

Early life
He was the son of Pengiran Shahbandar Pengiran Anak Abdul Wahab and grandson of Sultan Omar Ali Saifuddin I. He was also the brother in law of Sultan Hashim Jalilul Alam Aqamaddin.

Reign (1852-1885)
Abdul Momin succeeded his father-in-law Omar Ali Saifuddin II as sultan upon the latter's death in 1852, having previously served as regent for him during his ill health. During Abdul Momin's reign, the teachings of Islam were encouraged and he also sent some Ulama to Makkah.

Territorial losses 
During his reign, many territories were surrendered to James Brooke of Sarawak (White Rajahs); in 1855, seven districts stretching from Samarahan to Rajang were surrendered to James Brooke in the signing of a treaty. On 26 November 1856, the British signed a treaty with Sultan Abdul Momin to reconfirm the Treaty of Friendship and Commerce signed in 1847. In 1861, Brooke backed by the British government, visited Brunei to discuss the annexation of Mukah with the Sultan.

In 1865, Charles Lee Moses, an American Consul General, signed an agreement with Sultan Abdul Momin and obtained twenty one districts. The 1847 Treaty was breached tho no protests were made from the Sultan. In April 1868, Pope-Hennessy reported to the British Foreign Office that Charles Brooke had fined Sultan Abdul Momin by cutting payments to the Sultan for the territory handed over. This caused the British government to ban Charles from gaining any territories for the next ten years. That same year, the Sultan introduced a new type of tin Pitis coinage, also known as the umbrella coins.

In 1870, Abdul Momin planned a tour to Baram but had to withdraw due to his hostility shown by its local population. Throughout the 1870s, a war of influence was waged in the area of Baram due to the official British position. Without the permission of the Sultan nor the Consul General, Charles toured and his wife visited Baram River but unlike the Sultan, they were happily welcomed by locals in 1872. Local Kayans near the mouth of the river were fined for the murder of several Sarawak traders after the Sultan felt the awkwardness to find the offending tribe. However, in 1874, The Kayan of Baram revolted against Brunei after the tribes discovered from Sarawak traders that demanded more from them than what the Sultan had requested.

Charles L. Moses transferred his rights to the lease to Joseph William Torrey who sold it to Baron von Overbeck for $15,000 in January 1876. On 19 December 1877, Baron von Overbeck was appointed Maharaja of Sabah and Rajah of Gaya and Sandakan after an agreement with Sultan Abdul Momin. Overbeck went to Brunei and met the Temenggong to renew the concession. An agreement was made by Brunei to hand over all territory in northern Borneo under its control, with the Sultan receiving an annual payment of $12,000, while the Temenggong received a sum of $3,000.

On 15 January 1882, Peter Leys, the British Consul-General of Labuan sent several letters to Sultan Abdul Momin, to pressure him to settle the fine as soon as possible. After being backed into a corner, he had no other choice but to use his own money to pay the fine up to $2,660. The Sultan realized that further resistance was useless, so he agreed to lease Baram. In return, the Sultan received $3,000 annually, $2,000 was paid to Pengiran Temenggong Anak Hashim and two other Pengirans. In 1884, the British government granted the transfer of Baram and Trusan to Sarawak in 1882 and 1884, respectively. The transfer was also agreed by the Sultan and it allowed tribute to him.

Declaration of Amanat 
Realising that Brunei would become extinct, Abdul Momin declared the Amanat on 28 February 1885, an oath between the Sultan, Wazirs, Manteris, and holders of Tulin rights not to cede or lease any remaining territories to the foreign powers. In the years that followed, many Brunei territories continued to be taken, including Limbang. Also, at that time, Brunei did not have the military strength to enforce the Amanat.

Death
Sultan Abdul Momin passed away on 29 May 1885, and was buried in the Kubah Makam Di Raja at Bandar Seri Begawan. Abdul Momin was succeeded by his brother-in-law, Pengiran Temenggong Pengiran Anak Hashim, who was later known as Sultan Hashim Jalilul Alam Aqamaddin.

Personal life
He married Pengiran Anak Zubaidah, the daughter of Sultan Omar Ali Saifuddin II, thus making him the latter's son-in-law. He married Pengiran Anak Fatima as first wife, the daughter of Sultan Muhammad Khanzul Alam. They had issue a son, Pengiran Muda Prince Shahabuddin. (The prince ran away to North Borneo for the safety purpose)

References

External links
 List of Sultans of Brunei 

1780s births
1885 deaths
19th-century Sultans of Brunei